Tectonatica rizzae is a species of predatory sea snail, a marine gastropod mollusk in the family Naticidae, the moon snails.

References

Naticidae
Gastropods described in 1844